Marek Štěch (born 28 January 1990) is a Czech professional footballer who last played as a goalkeeper for  club Mansfield Town. He began his career with local club Sparta Prague, spending four years in their youth system. 

In 2006, aged 16, Štěch signed for Premier League club West Ham United for an undisclosed fee. Štěch had loan spells with Wycombe Wanderers and AFC Bournemouth in 2009, but made only three appearances in total. He made his first-team debut for West Ham in the League Cup in August 2010 before spending more time out on loan in League One with Yeovil Town and Leyton Orient in 2011–12. After six years with the club, Štěch left West Ham by mutual consent to join Yeovil Town permanently, and helped them win promotion to the Championship in 2012–13. He turned down a new contract with Yeovil, and re-signed for Sparta Prague in 2014. Štěch has represented the Czech Republic at under-17 and under-21 levels and has been capped once by the Czech Republic national team.

Club career

Early career
Born in Prague, Czechoslovakia, Štěch began his career with local club Sparta Prague, where he became a trainee in July 2005.

West Ham United

On 31 August 2006, Štěch signed for Premier League club West Ham United for an undisclosed fee. Due to an ankle injury, his debut was delayed until 17 November 2006, for the West Ham under-18 team in the Premier Academy League, which ended in a goalless draw against Chelsea. Štěch subsequently made his reserve-team debut in the 1–1 home draw against Portsmouth at the Boleyn Ground on 20 November 2006.

In July 2008, Štěch signed a new five-year contract with West Ham and was involved in the club's first-team pre-season programme. On 18 January 2009, he was named as first-team substitute goalkeeper for the first time for West Ham's visit to Newcastle United. On 12 March 2009, Štěch signed for League Two club Wycombe Wanderers on loan until the end of the season. Štěch made his Football League debut for Wycombe on 14 March 2009 in a 3–3 away draw against Brentford. However, a groin and hip injury sustained in training limited him to just two appearances for Wycombe, before returning to West Ham for treatment.

At the beginning of 2009–10, Štěch was handed the number 34 shirt. However, before making any appearances for the senior team, that number was taken by Olly Lee in a League Cup match against Millwall. On 11 December 2009, Štěch signed for League Two club AFC Bournemouth on an emergency loan due to last for seven days after Bournemouth after receiving special dispensation from the Football League. The following day, Štěch made his debut for Bournemouth but let in five goals as they lost 5–0 away to Morecambe. Štěch's loan with Bournemouth lasted only one match, and he returned to West Ham, where he was named as substitute goalkeeper in West Ham's next match, a 1–1 home draw with Chelsea. During the season, Štěch was named as substitute goalkeeper for West Ham on 14 occasions in all competitions, including 13 times in the Premier League and once in the FA Cup.

On 24 August 2010, Štěch made his debut for the West Ham first-team, against Oxford United in the League Cup, keeping a clean sheet in a 1–0 victory. He made a total of three appearances in the League Cup for West Ham and was an unused substitute on 13 occasions in the Premier League.

In October 2011, Štěch signed on loan for League One club Yeovil Town following an injury to Yeovil's first choice goalkeeper Jed Steer. He made his debut on 15 October 2011, in a 3–0 home defeat by Carlisle United. On 14 November 2011, he was recalled from his loan five days early by West Ham. He made five appearances for Yeovil, keeping one clean sheet and saving a penalty in a 0–0 draw with Stevenage on 22 October 2011. On 24 February 2012, Štěch signed on a month-long loan for League One club Leyton Orient. Štěch made his Leyton Orient debut the following day in a 1–1 draw against Bury, but he only managed two matches before suffering an ankle injury. At the end of 2011–12, West Ham confirmed that Štěch had left the club by mutual consent after six years in east London.

Yeovil Town
On 5 July 2012, following his departure from West Ham, Štěch signed permanently for League One club Yeovil Town on a two-year contract, becoming the club's first permanent goalkeeper on the books since 2008–09. Štěch made his first appearance of the season and permanent debut for Yeovil in a League Cup tie at home to Colchester United on 14 August 2012. Štěch was ever-present for Yeovil in 2012–13, playing 56 matches and keeping 19 clean sheets, and was man of the match in the 2013 League One play-off final as Yeovil won promotion to the Championship for the first time in their history.

After being substituted for Gareth Stewart in a 1–0 home defeat against Birmingham City, it was confirmed Štêch would be out for 3–4 months with a fractured hand. After four months out, Štěch made his return from injury in a 1–0 loss against Blackburn Rovers.

At the end of 2013–14, which resulted in Yeovil Town's relegation, Štěch was offered a new contract with the club.

Sparta Prague
Štěch rejected Yeovil's offer and moved back to Czech club Sparta Prague, the club he represented as a child, to replace outgoing Sparta goalkeeper Tomáš Vaclík.

Luton Town
On 14 June 2017, Štěch signed for League Two club Luton Town on a two-year contract upon the expiry of his contract with Sparta Prague. He made his debut on 5 August 2017, starting Luton's 8–2 win at home to former club Yeovil Town on the opening day of 2017–18, in which he saved a penalty from Otis Khan. Štěch kept his first clean sheet for Luton in a 3–0 victory at home to Colchester United on 19 August. He signed a one-year extension to his contract in June 2018.

Having not featured during the 2019–20 campaign, Štěch was released at the end of his contract.

Mansfield Town
Following his release by Luton, Štěch signed for Mansfield Town on a two-year contract. At the end of the 2020–21 season, Štěch was transfer-listed by Mansfield Town.

International career

Štěch was capped at under-17 and under-21 levels for the Czech Republic. He made his under-17 debut in a 1–0 win against Finland in February 2006, and played in the 2006 UEFA European Under-17 Championship as the Czech Republic finished the competition as runners-up to Russia. Štěch made his under-21 debut in a friendly against South Korea in March 2009, and was named in the Czech Republic's squad for the 2011 UEFA European Under-21 Championship, which they finished in fourth place.

On 13 May 2014, Štěch received his first call-up to the Czech Republic national team for their friendlies against Finland and Austria on 21 May 2014 and 5 June 2014. Although an unused substitute against Finland, Štěch started against Austria to earn his first cap for the national team.

Controversy
On 13 April 2013, Štěch posted two offensive tweets on his Twitter account. One of the tweets called Sparta's rival club Slavia Prague "Fucking jews". Štěch later deleted the two tweets and apologised.

Career statistics

Club

International

Honours
Yeovil Town
Football League One play-offs: 2013

Sparta Prague
Czech Supercup: 2014

Luton Town
EFL League Two runner-up: 2017–18

Czech Republic U17
European Under-17 Championship runner-up: 2006

Individual
PFA Team of the Year: 2017–18 League Two

References

External links

1990 births
Living people
Footballers from Prague
Czech footballers
Czech Republic youth international footballers
Czech Republic under-21 international footballers
Czech Republic international footballers
Association football goalkeepers
AC Sparta Prague players
West Ham United F.C. players
Wycombe Wanderers F.C. players
AFC Bournemouth players
Yeovil Town F.C. players
Leyton Orient F.C. players
Luton Town F.C. players
Mansfield Town F.C. players
English Football League players
Czech First League players
Czech expatriate footballers
Expatriate footballers in England
Czech expatriate sportspeople in England